In the 19th century, the term strongman referred to an exhibitor of strength or similar circus performers who performed feats of strength. More recently, strength athletics, also known as strongman competitions, have grown in popularity. These competitions are now composed of a variety of events in which competitors have to move the highest weights possible, the winner being the one having the highest tally across all events.

Description
In the first half of the 20th century, strongmen would perform various feats of strength such as the bent press (not to be confused with the bench press, which did not exist at the time), supporting large amounts of weight held overhead at arm's length, steel bending, chain breaking, etc. They needed to have large amounts of wrist, hand, and tendon strength for these feats, as well as prodigious oblique strength.

In the late 20th century the term strongman evolved to describe one who competes in strength athletics – a more modern eclectic strength competition in which competitors display their raw functional strength through exercises such as lifting rocks, toting refrigerators, pulling trains, towing an eighteen-wheel truck behind them, etc. The most famous competitions of this type are the World's Strongest Man, the Europe's Strongest Man, the Arnold Strongman Classic, the Strongman Champions League, the World's Ultimate Strongman, the Rogue Invitational and the Giants Live tour, and more than 20 countries also hold national-level competitions as well.

Many sports-specific training facilities have begun to incorporate movements associated with strongman competitions into their general training schemes, albeit with lighter weights used, e.g. tyre flips, sled drags, object loading or carrying, log pressing, farmer's walks and so on.

Training
Training for strongman involves building overall strength in the gym and training with competition implements to gain familiarity. In the gym, it is necessary to train the entire body for strength, especially with variants of the squat, deadlift, and overhead press. Also important is explosive power, developed by weightlifting-style lifts, and cardiovascular conditioning. Grip strength must also be developed.

Although you can do general strength training, at a typical gym, training with a strongman regimen requires equipment not typically found in a gym. Some equipment used in a strongman competition would have to be found custom-made or at a strongman gym. These equipment include Atlas Stone, Log (Log Press), Farmers Walk Bars, Yoke (Yoke Walk), Keg (Keg Toss), a vehicle.

Another part of a strongman's training is its intense diet regime. The biggest strongman competitors would need to ingest around 8,000 - 10,000 calories a day.

Events

Though competitive strongman events are ever changing, there are a number of staples that frequently appear on the international stage, including:

Incorrect usage
Strongman is often incorrectly used to describe a person who does weightlifting or bodybuilding. Due to the circus and entertainment background, nineteenth-century bodybuilders were expected to mingle with the crowd during intermission and perform strength feats like card tearing, nail bending, etc. to demonstrate strength as well as symmetry and size. Also, many strongmen sold photos of themselves nude or near-nude, flexing and posing. Although, what they considered the epitome of male beauty was different from modern ideals – particularly the very low emphasis on chest size, and great emphasis on oblique size, and symmetry as evidenced by photos of Eugen Sandow.

Notable strongmen

Traditional Strongmen
The Strongmen are listed according to the chronological order of their birth.

Modern Strongmen

The following 73 strongmen have reached the podium (1st, 2nd or 3rd place) of World's Strongest Man since 1977 and/or World Muscle Power Classic from 1985 to 2004 and/or Arnold Strongman Classic since 2002. They are listed according to the chronological order of their podium appearance. 

23 of them have won the World's Strongest Man (WSM), 11 have won the World Muscle Power Classic (WMPC) and 8 have won the Arnold Strongman Classic (ASC).

7 men have won both WSM & WMPC (Kazmaier, Capes, Sigmarsson, Reeves, Magnússon, Ahola, Karlsen). 4 men have won both WSM & ASC (Savickas, Shaw, Björnsson, Licis).  

Additionally, following 46 strongmen have reached either 4th or 5th places of World's Strongest Man and/or World Muscle Power Classic and/or Arnold Strongman Classic:

Lou Ferrigno, Franco Columbu, Jon Kolb, Gus Rethwisch, Bishop Dolegiewicz, Jerry Hannan, Craig Wolfley, Ernie Hackett, Hamish Davidson, Rudolph Kuester, George Hechter, Dan Markovic, Jean-Pierre Brulois, Tom Hawk, László Fekete, Adrian Smith, Berend Veneberg, Heinz Ollesch, Pieter de Bruyn, Martin Muhr, Wayne Price, Nathan Jones, Bill Lyndon, Johnny Perry, Brian Bell, Arvydas Pintinas, Andy Bolton, Steve Kirit, Bill Pittuck, Sami Heinonen, Jarek Dymek, Brian Schoonveld, Odd Haugen, Brian Siders, Benedikt Magnússon, Mark Felix, Tarmo Mitt, Vidas Blekaitis, Stefán Sölvi Pétursson, Laurence Shahlaei, Krzysztof Radzikowski, Dimitar Savatinov, Konstantine Janashia, Matjaz Belsak, Rob Kearney and Trey Mitchell.

International Accolades

Below table summarizes the 50 most decorated strongmen in modern history with the most number of international wins (1st places) in their careers.
No. of total career competitions against the No. of wins (1st places only).

- As at 1 January 2023

See also
 List of strongmen
 List of strongman competitions
 Grip strength
 Lifting stone
 Power training
 Strength training
 Strongwoman
 World Strongman Federation
 World Strongman Cup Federation
 Highland games (Scottish heritage)
 History of physical training and fitness

References

External links

 United States All Round Weightlifting Association
 Oldtime Strongman
 Old-School Strongmen – slideshow by Life magazine
 Oldtime Strongmen List
 World Strongman Federation

Sports occupations and roles
Strength athletics

Circus skills